Kalimayai is the illusion caused by the evil spirit of Kali Yukam, (not the Hindu deity kali) according to Akilattirattu Ammanai the source of Ayyavazhi mythology.

See also
List of Ayyavazhi-related articles

Ayyavazhi philosophical concepts